Morithamnus is a genus of Brazilian flowering plants in the tribe Eupatorieae within the family Asteraceae.

 Species
 Morithamnus crassus R.M.King, H.Rob. & G.M.Barroso - State of Bahia in eastern Brazil
 Morithamnus ganophyllus (Mattf. ex Pilg.) R.M.King & H.Rob.  - State of Bahia in eastern Brazil

References

Eupatorieae
Asteraceae genera
Endemic flora of Brazil